The Carnate derailment occurred in Lombardy, Italy on 19 August 2020 when a passenger train ran away from Paderno-Robbiate station [it] and was derailed at Carnate-Usmate station.

Accident
The train was reported to have run away from Paderno d'Adda without crew, and with a passenger detected after the derailment. The train was to operate a Paderno d'Adda-Milan service about 25 minutes after the start of the runaway from Paderno d'Adda, which took place about 15 minutes after its arrival from Milan; it included a Class E.464 locomotive (in the rear position), six carriages and a control car.

The control car and the first three carriages of the train derailed. Three people were injured (the passenger, and the 2 crew members while trying to get on the runaway train in Paderno d'Adda); they all suffered minor injuries, and the passenger was taken to the hospital for checks.

The driver and conductor of the train were suspended from duty after the accident.

Investigation
An investigation was opened into the accident. The Polfer [it] is responsible for investigating railway accidents in Italy. The train event recorder was recovered from the E.464 and handed over to investigators.

References

21st century in Lombardy
August 2020 events in Italy
Derailments in Italy
Province of Monza and Brianza
Railway accidents in 2020